Nasra Nahimana (born 10 December 1999) is a Burundian footballer who plays as a defender for Burundi women's national team.

References

External links 
 

1999 births
Living people
Burundian women's footballers
Women's association football defenders
Burundi women's international footballers